La dottoressa sotto il lenzuolo (Translation: The Lady Doctor Under the Sheet) is a 1976 commedia sexy all'italiana film directed by Gianni Martucci and launched as part of dottoressa (female doctor) sexploitation theme. The film was also released as Under The Sheets.

Plot
Three friends, students at the Pisa medical school are after their love adventures. Benito (Angelo Pellegrini) is trying to win the favours of Nurse Italia (Orchidea De Santis) but she seems to prefer the company of Prof. Ciotti (Gigi Ballista). Naïve Alvaro (Alvaro Vitali) is desperate to lose his virginity with his girlfriend Lella (Ely Galleani) without knowing that she lives a double life as a prostitute. Finally, Sandro (Eligio Zamara) is in love with the film's namesake Dr. Laura Bonetti (Karin Schubert), the fiancée of Prof. Paolo Cicchirini (Gastone Pescucci) who happens to be the butt of jokes at the medical school, and pretends to be sick to see her.

Cast
 Karin Schubert
 Gastone Pescucci
 Orchidea De Santis
 Eligio Zamara
 Gigi Ballista
 Alvaro Vitali

References

External links

La dottoressa sotto il lenzuolo at Variety Distribution
 https://www.bfi.org.uk/films-tv-people/4ce2b70e152aa

1976 films
Commedia sexy all'italiana
Films set in Pisa
1970s sex comedy films
1976 comedy films
1970s Italian-language films
1970s Italian films